Peter Bircumshaw (29 August 1938 – June 2017) was a footballer who played as a left winger in the Football League for Notts County, Bradford City and Stockport County.

Bircumshaw started his professional career with Notts County, where he scored 40 goals in 72 league games before he moved to Bradford City in 1962. He spent just one season at Valley Parade, but he finished as the club's joint top goal-scorer with seven league goals and four in the FA Cup, including a hat-trick in a 5–2 win over Oldham Athletic. He joined Stockport County before he moved into non-league football with Cambridge City.  He was with Cambridge City from February 1964 to January 1965. 

Bircumshaw's brother Tony also played professional football.

References

External links
 

1938 births
2017 deaths
Footballers from Mansfield
English footballers
Association football midfielders
Notts County F.C. players
Bradford City A.F.C. players
Stockport County F.C. players
Cambridge City F.C. players
English Football League players